Amherst Regional High School (ARHS) is located in Amherst, Nova Scotia, Canada. The school delivers classes from grade 9 to 12 as well as the Career Exploration Program (CEP) an hosts the largest allocation of NSISP (Nova Scotia International Student Program) students in Nova Scotia.

The first ARHS location opened in 1893 on Spring Street. It closed in 2000 when the "new" Amherst Regional High School opened on Willow Street. The new ARHS was the last of the "Private Partner" schools in Nova Scotia.

The new location includes a regulation high school gymnasium and a 493-seat auditorium.

References

External links
 Official website

Amherst, Nova Scotia
High schools in Nova Scotia
Schools in Cumberland County, Nova Scotia